The 1975 Senior League World Series took place from August 11–16 in Gary, Indiana, United States. Pingtung, Taiwan defeated Chicago, Illinois in the championship game. It was Taiwan's fourth straight championship.

Teams

Results

References

Senior League World Series
Senior League World Series
Baseball competitions in Indiana
Sports in Gary, Indiana
1975 in sports in Indiana